Elections to Magherafelt District Council were held on 21 May 1997 on the same day as the other Northern Irish local government elections. The election used three district electoral areas to elect a total of 16 councillors.

Election results

Note: "Votes" are the first preference votes.

Districts summary

|- class="unsortable" align="centre"
!rowspan=2 align="left"|Ward
! % 
!Cllrs
! % 
!Cllrs
! %
!Cllrs
! %
!Cllrs
! % 
!Cllrs
!rowspan=2|TotalCllrs
|- class="unsortable" align="center"
!colspan=2 bgcolor="" | Sinn Féin
!colspan=2 bgcolor="" | DUP
!colspan=2 bgcolor="" | SDLP
!colspan=2 bgcolor="" | UUP
!colspan=2 bgcolor="white"| Others
|-
|align="left"|Magherafelt Town
|24.9
|1
|23.2
|2
|bgcolor="#D46A4C"|39.0
|bgcolor="#D46A4C"|2
|11.4
|1
|1.5
|0
|6
|-
|align="left"|Moyola
|bgcolor="#008800"|34.1
|bgcolor="#008800"|2
|19.2
|1
|22.0
|1
|19.9
|1
|4.8
|0
|5
|-
|align="left"|Sperrin
|bgcolor="#008800"|51.0
|bgcolor="#008800"|2
|25.3
|2
|9.9
|0
|12.1
|1
|1.7
|0
|5
|- class="unsortable" class="sortbottom" style="background:#C9C9C9"
|align="left"| Total
|36.5
|5
|22.6
|5
|20.6
|3
|14.3
|3
|6.0
|0
|16
|-
|}

District results

Magherafelt Town

1993: 2 x DUP, 2 x SDLP, 1 x Sinn Féin, 1 x UUP
1997: 2 x DUP, 2 x SDLP, 1 x Sinn Féin, 1 x UUP
1993-1997 Change: No change

Moyola

1993: 2 x DUP, 1 x Sinn Féin, 1 x UUP, 1 x SDLP
1997: 2 x Sinn Féin, 1 x DUP, 1 x UUP, 1 x SDLP
1993-1997 Change: Sinn Féin gain from DUP

Sperrin

1993: 2 x Sinn Féin, 2 x SDLP, 1 x UUP
1997: 2 x Sinn Féin, 2 x SDLP, 1 x UUP
1993-1997 Change: No change

References

Magherafelt District Council elections
Magherafelt